The Cyprus grass snake (Natrix natrix cypriaca) is an endangered subspecies of the grass snake (Natrix natrix) and is endemic to the island of Cyprus. Hans-Jorg Wiedl, also known as Snake George, is working hard to save this rare snake and has created an online petition to appeal for help.

References 

Natrix
Endemic fauna of Cyprus